Two Seconds to Midnight is the first album released by the Alan Baylock Jazz Orchestra, a Washington, D.C.-based big band. Released in 2003 through Sea Breeze Jazz Records, the album is composed of arrangements by Baylock on a number of jazz standards as well as some of his original compositions. The album featured guest appearances by pianist Kenny Werner. It was recorded at Bias Recording Studios in Springfield, VA.

Track listing
All arrangements are by Alan Baylock unless otherwise noted.

Personnel

The Alan Baylock Jazz Orchestra is composed of musicians from the D.C. area, particularly from the Airmen of Note, Army Blues, and Navy Commodores jazz ensembles. This album also featured renowned jazz pianist Kenny Werner as a guest artist on tracks "Cottontail" and "Sea Changes".

Bandleader/Arranger 

 Alan Baylock

Saxophones

 Andy Axelrad - alto sax/flute
 Antonio Orta - alto sax/flute
 Joseph Henson - alto sax
 Tyler Kuebler - tenor sax/clarinet
 Luis Hernandez - tenor sax
 Jeff Antoniuk - tenor sax/soprano sax/clarinet
 Chad Makela - baritone sax/bass clarinet
 Doug Morgan - baritone sax

Trumpets

 Brian MacDonald
 Mike Davis
 Mike Kamuf
 Rich Sigler
 Tim Leahey

Trombones

 Ben Patterson
 Jeff Martin
 Joe Jackson
 Jeff Cortazzo - bass trombone

Rhythm

 Shawn Purcell - guitar
 Bob Larson - piano
 John Pineda - bass
 Paul Henry - bass
 Steve Fidyk - drums

Production

 Bob Dawson - engineer/recording/mixing/producer
 Charlie Pilzer - mastering
 Joseph Magee - recording/mixing/producer
 Alan Baylock - producer

References

External links
 Review
 CDBaby

2003 albums
Jazz albums by American artists
Big band albums